The Independent Scientific Advisory Group for Emergencies, better known as Independent SAGE, is a group of scientists, unaffiliated to government (although some are also in the government SAGE), that publishes advice aimed toward the UK government regarding the COVID-19 pandemic. Its name is based on SAGE, the name of the government's official Scientific Advisory Group for Emergencies.

The questions raised about the transparency of SAGE and possible political interference during the COVID-19 pandemic in the United Kingdom led to concerns about trust in public health messaging being raised by scientists and by the media. As an alternative, a group of scientists created Independent SAGE, chaired by Sir David Anthony King, a former Government Chief Scientific Advisor, in early May 2020 to "provide a clear structure on which an effective policy should be based given the inevitability that the virus will continue to cross borders".

The non-profit group The Citizens, created by The Observer journalist and political activist Carole Cadwalladr, were a founding partner with Independent SAGE in May 2020. They continue to support Independent SAGE's social media and web presence.

Public statements 
In May 2020, Independent SAGE warned against ending lockdown prematurely in places like schools. In July 2020, they published a strategy pressing the UK government to achieve ‘zero Covid,’ stating ‘The prospect of many thousands of further deaths from COVID-19 over the next nine months is unacceptable,' although in the same report they noted only one infectious disease - smallpox - has ever been successfully eliminated. 

In September 2020, Independent SAGE called for immediate government action to prevent further increase in the prevalence of COVID-19 infection, to prevent the need for a second national lockdown.

In November 2020, Sir David King stated that he was considering continuing Independent SAGE's work after the coronavirus pandemic, with a focus on combatting climate change.

Members

Current 

 Professor Danny Altmann
 Professor Anthony Costello
 Professor Sheena Cruickshank
 Professor Karl Friston
 Professor Trish Greenhalgh
 Dr Steve Griffin
 Dr Zubaida Haque
 Dr Binita Kane
 Professor Aris Katzourakis
 Dr Lennard Lee
 Professor Martin McKee
 Professor Susan Michie
 Dr Tolullah Oni
 Professor Christina Pagel
 Professor Stephen Reicher
 Dr Duncan Robertson
 Dr Helen Salisbury
 Professor Gabriel Scally
 Dr Kit Yates

Former 

 Professor Kamlesh Khunti
 Sir David King
 Doctor Alison Pittard
 Professor Allyson Pollock
 Dr Deepti Gurdasani
 Professor Deenan Pillay

References

External links 
 

2020 establishments in the United Kingdom
Scientific organisations based in the United Kingdom
Emergency management in the United Kingdom
Organizations established for the COVID-19 pandemic
COVID-19 pandemic in the United Kingdom